The French-language surname Rousset may refer to:

 Alain Rousset (born 1951), French politician
 Christophe Rousset (born 1961), French conductor and harpsichordist
 Gilles Rousset (born 1963), French footballer
 David Rousset (1912–1997), French writer and prisoner in the German Neuengamme concentration camp
 Jean-François Rousset (born 1952), French politician
 Jean Rousset (1910–2002), Swiss literary critic and theorist, often associated with the Geneva School of literary criticism
Jean Rousset de Missy (1686–1762), French writer

French-language surnames